Harghita County (and) is a county (județ) in the center of Romania, in eastern Transylvania, with the county seat at Miercurea Ciuc.

Demographics

2002 census 

In 2002, Harghita County had a population of 326,222 and a population density of 52/km2.

 Hungarians – 84.62% (or 276,038)
 Romanians – 14.06% (or 45,870)
 Romani – 1.18% (or 3,835)
 Others – 0.14%

2011 census 

In 2011, it had a population of 302,432 and a population density of 46/km2.

 Hungarians – 85.21% (or 257,707)
 Romanians – 12.96% (or 39,196)
 Romani
 Others – 1.76% (or 5,326).

Harghita county has the highest percentage of Hungarians in Romania, just ahead of Covasna county. The Hungarians form the majority of the population in most of the county's municipalities, with Romanians concentrated in the northern and eastern part of the county (particularly Toplița and Bălan), as well as in the enclave of Voșlăbeni.

The Székelys of Harghita are mostly Roman Catholic, with Reformed and Unitarian minorities, while the ethnic Romanians are primarily Orthodox. Catholicism is strongest in the east, in the former Csíkszék, while Protestants are concentrated in the west, south and west of Odorheiu Secuiesc.  By religion, the county is divided roughly as follows:

 Roman Catholic (65%)
 Orthodox (13%)
 Reformed (13%)
 Unitarian (7%)
 Other (2%)

Demographic evolution

Geography
Harghita County has a total area of 6,639 km2.

Harghita consists primarily of mountains, connected to the Eastern Carpathians, such as the Ciuc and Harghita Mountains; volcanic plateaux, foothills, and the more densely populated river valleys.

The mountains are volcanic in origin, and the region is known for its excellent hot mineral springs. Harghita is known as one of the coldest regions in Romania, although summers can be quite warm.

It is in this county that two of the most important rivers in Romania, the Mureș and the Olt, originate. These rivers' origins, near the villages of Izvoru Mureșului and Sândominic, are only a few miles apart; yet the Mureș flows west to the Tisza, while the Olt flows south to the Danube. In the western part of the county the two Târnava rivers (Târnava Mare and Târnava Mică) flow to the Târnava Plateau, which is part of the Transylvanian Plateau.

Harghita's spectacular natural scenery includes Sfânta Ana Lake, a volcanic crater lake near the town of Băile Tușnad; Lacul Roșu a mountain lake in the northeast near the town of Gheorgheni, and Cheile Bicazului, a dramatic, narrow canyon formed by the Bicaz stream. The county is renowned for its spa resorts and mineral waters.

Neighbours

 Neamț County and Bacău County to the East.
 Mureș County to the West.
 Suceava County to the North.
 Brașov County and Covasna County to the South.

Economy
The county's main industries:
 Wood industry – up to 30%;
 Foods and beverages industry;
 Textile and leather processing;
 Mechanical components.

Tourism

The main tourist attractions in Harghita county are
 The cities of Miercurea Ciuc, Odorheiu Secuiesc, Gheorgheni, Toplița.
 The mountain resorts of
 Băile Tușnad
 Borsec
 Lacul Roșu
 Izvorul Mureşului
 Harghita Băi
 Lake Sfânta Ana (crater lake)

Politics 

The Harghita County Council, renewed at the 2020 local elections, consists of 30 counsellors, with the following party composition:

Administrative divisions

Harghita County has 4 municipalities, 5 towns and 58 communes
Municipalities
Gheorgheni
Miercurea Ciuc – county seat; population: 37,980 (as of 2011)
Odorheiu Secuiesc
Toplița
Towns
Băile Tușnad
Bălan
Borsec
Cristuru Secuiesc
Vlăhița

Communes
Atid
Avrămești
Bilbor
Brădești
Căpâlnița
Cârța
Ciceu
Ciucsângeorgiu
Ciumani
Corbu
Corund
Cozmeni
Dănești
Dârjiu
Dealu

Ditrău
Feliceni
Frumoasa
Gălăutaș
Joseni
Lăzarea
Leliceni
Lueta
Lunca de Jos
Lunca de Sus
Lupeni
Mădăraș
Mărtiniș
Merești
Mihăileni

Mugeni
Ocland
Păuleni-Ciuc
Plăieșii de Jos
Porumbeni
Praid
Racu
Remetea
Săcel
Sâncrăieni
Sândominic
Sânmartin
Sânsimion
Sântimbru

Sărmaș
Satu Mare
Secuieni
Siculeni
Șimonești
Subcetate
Suseni
Tomești
Tulgheș
Tușnad
Ulieș
Vărșag
Voșlăbeni
Zetea

See also
Former Csík County of the Kingdom of Hungary

References

External links

 
Counties of Romania
Hungarian communities in Romania
Geography of Transylvania
1968 establishments in Romania
States and territories established in 1968